Selhurst is a suburb of south London, England.

Selhurst may also refer to:
 Selhurst, North Ward, an historic house in Queensland, Australia
 Selhurst (ward), an electoral division in the London Borough of Croydon
 Selhurst School, a fictional school created by prankster H. Rochester Sneath
 Selhurst railway station in south London

See also
 Selhurst Park, a football ground in south London, home of Crystal Palace FC
 Selhurst High School, the name of two schools in the London Borough of Croydon